The 2004 Norwegian Football Cup Final was the final match of the 2004 Norwegian Football Cup, the 99th season of the Norwegian Football Cup, the premier Norwegian football cup competition organized by the Football Association of Norway (NFF). The match was played on 7 November 2004 at the Ullevaal Stadion in Oslo, and opposed two Tippeligaen sides Brann and Lyn. Brann defeated Lyn 4–1 to claim the Norwegian Cup for a sixth time in their history.

Route to the final

Match

Details

References

2004
SK Brann matches
Lyn Fotball matches
Football Cup
Sports competitions in Oslo
2000s in Oslo
November 2004 sports events in Europe